Grazer is a German surname. Notable people with the surname include:

Brian Grazer (born 1951), American Oscar-winning film and television producer
Gigi Levangie Grazer (born 1963), American novelist and screenwriter
Jack Dylan Grazer (born 2003), American child actor